Johannes van Dreght (11 November 1737, Amsterdam - 7 October 1807, Amsterdam) was a Dutch decorative painter; known for his work on fireplaces, carriages, yachts, sleds and fans.

Life and work
He became a member of the local Guild of Saint Luke in 1758. He married in 1761 and was elected to the Stadstekenacademie, Amsterdam, in 1766 and received an honorary prize from the Drawing Academy. Politically, he was a supporter of the Patriottentijd; a group that admired the ancient Roman Republic

In 1772, he created a chimney piece for the Town Hall, as well as works for the original Dutch Theater (1774), the buildings at 518 and 520 Herengracht and in the Corvershof, a home belonging to the son of Mayor  (1778). In 1781, and again in 1792, he provided the sets and scenery for productions of The Barber of Seville, by Beaumarchais. Much of his work represents a transition to Neoclassicism.

The wallpaper designer, Jurriaen Andriessen, is one of his best known students. The poet, Willem Bilderdijk, learned some etching and drawing techniques from him.

Sources
 D. Carasso, "Idem ardor agit. De schilder Joannes van Dreght en zijn leerling Willem Bilderdijk", in: E.K. Grootes and J. den Haan (Eds.), Geschiedenis, godsdienst, letterkunde. Opstellen aangeboden aan dr. S.B.J. Zilverberg ter gelegenheid van zijn afscheid van de Universiteit van Amsterdam, Roden 1989, p. 208-220. Online
 De verzameling Van Eeghen. Amsterdamse tekeningen 1600-1950, Gemeentearchief Amsterdam (1989)

External links

1737 births
1807 deaths
Dutch painters
Decorative arts
Painters from Amsterdam